Mark Rurup (born 22 July 1975, Zaanstad) is a Dutch curler from Amsterdam who curls out of the Curling Club Utrecht. He is the third of the Praxis Hammerheads which is the Dutch national team. Rurup has played in 3 European Championships. In 2005 he was the alternate for Reg Wiebe, and finished 19th. In 2007, he was the team's lead, and finished 17th. In 2009, he finished 11th, playing third for Mark Neeleman.

External links
 http://www.hammerheads.nl
 http://www.curlingclubutrecht.nl
 WCT Player Profile 
 WCF Player Profile

1975 births
Living people
Dutch male curlers
Sportspeople from Zaanstad
20th-century Dutch people